Palanca TV is an Angolan private TV station that began broadcasting on December 15, 2015. The channel is available for Angolan subscribers through South African satellite service provider DStv.

Weekly programming

See also
 TV Zimbo

External links
 Palanca TV at lyngsat

References

Television stations in Angola
Portuguese-language television networks
Portuguese-language television stations
Television channels and stations established in 2015